WJDZ (90.1 FM) is a radio station  broadcasting a Contemporary Christian format. Licensed to Pastillo, Puerto Rico, the station serves the Puerto Rico area.  The station is currently owned by Juan Esteban Díaz, through licensee; Siembra Fertil P.R., Inc. The station is operated under a Time Brokerage Agreement by Ministerio En Pie de Guerra, Inc.

History
The station went on the air as WWQS on September 9, 1996. On July 6, 2006, the station changed its call sign to the current WJDZ.

References

External links

Radio stations established in 2005
Juana Díaz, Puerto Rico
Contemporary Christian radio stations in Puerto Rico
2005 establishments in Puerto Rico